The Adversary Cycle is a series of seven novels written by American author F. Paul Wilson. While it was originally known as "The Nightworld Cycle" (this name is even printed in the front of some early editions of Nightworld), John Clute, in his section on F. Paul Wilson's work in The Encyclopedia of Science Fiction, kept referring to "the Adversary." The author liked that better and so renamed the cycle.

Novels 
The seven novels that comprise The Adversary Cycle are (in chronological order):

The Keep, July 1981, 
The Tomb, November 1984, 
The Touch, April 1986, 
Reborn, May 1990, 
Reprisal, August 1991, 
Nightworld, May 1992, 
Signalz, July 2020, ISBN 978-1-951510-43-5

However, the book series does not fall into a strict chronological order, with alternative orderings suggested. For example, Wilson's website suggests an order of The Keep, Reborn, The Touch, The Tomb, Reprisal, Signalz, and Nightworld.

The Tomb and The Touch were initially written as stand-alone novels; it is only in Nightworld that they were retroactively made part of the Cycle as their respective protagonists all come together to fight the final battle against the Otherness.

Although these seven books make up the "core" of "The Adversary Cycle", many more novels and short stories tie into the series. For example, The Tomb is also the start of the Repairman Jack series of novels, which quickly became deeply entwined with the Adversary Cycle. They take place in the last three years before Nightworld and include some of the main characters from the original Adversary Cycle. This is all part of the "Grand Unification" theme of Wilson's works known as The Secret History of the World.

References

Book series introduced in 1981
Horror novel series
Novel series